Rising Star is the third Indian version of the international franchise series Rising Star, a reality television singing competition. It is based on the Israeli singing competition HaKokhav HaBa (meaning The Next Star) made by Keshet Broadcasting Ltd.

The program format lets the viewers vote for contestants live via the television channel's mobile app Voot. The show premiered on 16 March 2019 on Colors TV. Playback singer and music director Shankar Mahadevan and actor-singer Diljit Dosanjh return as the experts and are joined by playback singer  Neeti Mohan in this season. The show was hosted by playback singer Aditya Narayan.

Format
In contrast to other singing competition TV shows which feature a cast of celebrity judges, Rising Star features a cast of celebrity experts and considers the viewers at home the judges. During each performance, the audience at home is able to decide in real time whether or not a contestant is sent through to the next round by using a mobile voting app.

While the viewers at home are considered the "judges", the expert panelists also may influence the vote but with continuously decreasing percentage votes over the total public vote and not exceeding 5% of the total voting power.

The Auditions
The first round where the acts are individually called to perform. As a reportage of the announced performer is shown, viewers are invited to register for voting for that specific act. Following a countdown of three seconds, the candidate has to start performing behind a screen called "The Wall".

With start of performance, the voting kicks in. Registered voters have the option of voting just "Yes" or "No". Non-votes are also considered "No" votes. If an expert votes "Yes", another 5% is added to the tally of the contestant. The contestants also see random photos of voters in their favour. Faces of panelists voting "Yes" are also shown in larger frames.

Once the contestant reaches 80% of "Yes" votes, the wall is raised and the contestant goes to the next round of the competition.

The Duels
Contestants who make it through the auditions are paired by the judges to face off in a duel. The first contestant sings with the wall up and sets the benchmark for the second contestant. The second contestant sings with the wall down. If the second contestant betters the first contestant's vote total, the wall rises and the second contestant was through to the next round while the first contestant is eliminated; if the second contestant fails to raise the wall, the second contestant is eliminated and the first contestant goes through.

Live auditions
Color key

The Live auditions began from 10 March 2019 on the grand finale of Fear Factor: Khatron Ke Khiladi 9.

Duels ki Takkar
Color key

Grand Premiere

Episode 10: 14 April 2019 

This round had no voting and elimination. Voting for song selection was done for Shankar Mahadevan and Ananya Nanda. Ananya selected song:"Bumbro Bumbro" and Shankar Mahadevan selected "Maahi Ve" and audience voted. Maximum audience selected "Maahi Ve" and both sang the song.

Salam-E-Rekha

Episode 11: 21 April 2019 

Color key

Summer Camp & Bachpan ke Din

Episode 12: 27 April 2019 

Color key

Episode 13: 28 April 2019 

Color key

Fully Filmy

Episode 14: 4 May 2019 

Color key

Episode 15: 5 May 2019 

Color key

Lakshmikant-Pyarelal Songs & Parents Special

Episode 16: 11 May 2019 

Color key

Episode 17: 12 May 2019 

Color key

Dosti Special & Madhuri Dixit Special

Episode 18: 18 May 2019 

Second Chance:

Color key

Dosti Special:

Color key

Episode 19: 19 May 2019 

Madhuri Dixit Special:

Color key

Qawwali Special & Bharat Special

Episode 20: 25 May 2019 

Challenger Week

In this week contestant challenged each other to beat their score. The contestant who  sat on the Red Chair till the end of the episode was Eliminated.

Color key

Episode 21: 26 May 2019 

Color key

Ticket To Finale & Semi Finale Week
The contestants compete to earn a direct entry to the finale week for Ticket To Finale.

Episode 22: 1 June 2019 

Color key

Episode 23: 2 June 2019 

Color key

Grand Finale

Episode 24: 8 June 2019 

First Round:
Judges had 3% votes.
 

Color key

Second Round:
Judges had no voting power.

Color key

India's Favourite 17

Scoring Chart

 The contestant was the highest scorer.
 The contestant was the second highest scorer.
 The contestant was the second lowest scorer.
 The contestant was the lowest scorer and was eliminated.
 The contestant was actually eliminated but was saved on Expert's Request.
 The contestant had a chance to return, won and re-entered the competition.
 The contestant had a chance to return to the competition but lost was eliminated again.
 Ticket To Finale
 Winner
 1st Runner-up
 2nd Runner-up
 3rd Runner-up

Guests

  Guest Judge
  Expert Judge
  Guest Companion

References

2019 Indian television seasons
Rising Star (Indian TV series)